Nikolayevka is a rural locality (a selo) and the administrative center of Nikolayevsky Selsoviet, Blagoveshchensky District, Altai Krai, Russia. The population was 618 as of 2013. There are 5 streets.

Geography 
Nikolayevka is located 28 km northeast of Blagoveshchenka (the district's administrative centre) by road. Tatyanovka is the nearest rural locality.

References 

Rural localities in Blagoveshchensky District, Altai Krai